The majority of parkways in the US state of New York are part of a statewide parkway system owned by several public and private agencies but mostly maintained by the New York State Department of Transportation (NYSDOT). A handful of other roads in the Hudson Valley and on Long Island are also known as parkways but are not part of the state system. The roads of the state parkway system were among the first limited-access roads to be constructed. These highways were not divided and allowed no driveway cuts, but did have intersections for some of the streets they crossed. A small section of the privately financed Long Island Motor Parkway was the first limited-access road to begin operation as a toll road and the first highway to use bridges and overpasses to eliminate intersections.

The individual parkways vary widely in composition. Some, such as the Sprain Brook Parkway, are functionally equivalent to a freeway; others, like Seven Lakes Drive, are two-lane undivided surface roads. The majority of parkways are located in downstate New York, where the state parkway system originated in the early 20th century.

State parkways
The state's parkway system originally began as a series of then-high-speed four-lane roads that were created to provide a scenic way into, out of, and around New York City. The first section of this system opened in 1908. Most of the early roads have been replaced and redesigned to address higher speed requirements and to increase capacity. In later sections north of New York City, the roadways were typically divided by a wide landscaped median and provided service areas along the way that offered fuel and restrooms. During the 1930s, urban planner Robert Moses developed a system of parkways in the New York City area.

Many of these parkways were built by regional agencies such as the Long Island State Park Commission (LISPC), New York City Parks Department, Taconic State Park Commission (TSPC), Westchester County Parks Commission (WCPC), and Palisades Interstate Park Commission (PIPC). Most are now maintained, if not owned, by NYSDOT outside New York City and the New York City Department of Transportation (NYCDOT) within New York City.

Today, the state parkways are for the most part equivalent to expressways and freeways built in other parts of the country, except for a few oddities. First, because many of these roads were either designed before civil engineers had experience building roads for automobile use or widened in response to increasing traffic, many New York parkways lack shoulders. Second, because designers focused more on making routes scenic rather than efficient, the parkways are meandering, often built to follow a river, and so contain many turns. Finally, because most use low, decorative stone-arch overpasses that would trap trucks, commercial vehicles, trucks and tractor trailers are banned from parkways. In Manhattan, this has led to nearly all trucks being forced onto local streets as the island has only one short Interstate (the Trans-Manhattan Expressway) passing through Washington Heights, a neighborhood in Upper Manhattan.

List of parkways

Other parkways
Some regions of New York have parkways that are not owned or maintained by a state agency. Westchester County, for example, contains some highways that were originally part of the TSPC and WCPC, while Suffolk County has preserved a section of the former Long Island Motor Parkway (LIMP) for current driving and built their own roads on land originally reserved for the LISPC. The surviving remnant of the LIMP in western Suffolk County, named the Vanderbilt Motor Parkway, became a surface street that is no longer a controlled-access road nor off-limits to commercial vehicles.

List of parkways

References

External links 
 Official NYSDOT site

 
Parkways